Loïc Le Meur (born 14 July 1972) is a French entrepreneur and blogger. He served as Executive Vice President EMEA at software company Six Apart after merging French blogging company Ublog with Six Apart in July 2004. In late 2006 Le Meur became a public backer of French presidential candidate Nicolas Sarkozy and joined Sarkozy's campaign team as an advisor on Internet-related topics.

Career
In 1996, Loïc Le Meur founded his first company, interactive agency B2L.

He also founded RapidSite France with his wife  a web hosting company for small businesses in France. In 1999, he sold RapidSite to France Télécom where it became part of Wanadoo.

In 2000, he founded application service provider Tekora.

In 2003, he got involved with French weblog hosting company Ublog which he purchased from its founder, fellow Breton Stéphane Le Solliec in October 2003. He then grew Ublog and merged the company with Six Apart where he became Executive Vice President in 2004. He held his role as EVP EMEA until March 2007 when he handed his job over to long-time business partner Olivier Creiche. Le Meur remains Honorary Chair of Six Apart Europe.

In 2015, he founded leade.rs, a platform for keynote speakers. In 2019, leade.rs was acquired by Animoca. Le Meur joined Animoca as a venture partner to assist in growth and expansion opportunities.

Blogging & LeWeb
In 2004 Le Meur became part of the team behind the official World Economic Forum blog.

Since 2004, he co-founded and organized a conference focused on blogging and the web world with Géraldine Le Meur, his wife until recently. In December 2006, he managed to get Shimon Peres, Nicolas Sarkozy, and French politician François Bayrou on stage at LeWeb '03. More than 2,600 people from 60 different countries came in 2010. About 3200 came for the 2014 session '14

Seesmic
In 2007, Le Meur moved to San Francisco to launch a new startup named Seesmic.

Seesmic was initially focused on the creation of an online community of video bloggers. Following the 2008 economic crisis Seesmic's became a social media client company. In January 2010, Seesmic acquired Ping.fm  and allowed its users to update simultaneously more than 50 different social media statuses.  In February 2011, Seesmic received funding from Salesforce.com and Softbank, bringing total funding to $16 million. In September 2012, Seesmic was acquired by HootSuite.

Bibliography
 Blogs pour les pros by Loïc Le Meur and Laurence Beauvais, Dunod , November 2005
 La révolution podcast by Loïc Le Meur and Laurence Beauvais, Dunod , September 2006.

On social media 
 On December 11, 2016, Le Meur shared his concern about Tesla Motors drivers using charging slots as parking space on Twitter. Elon Musk immediately took action and fixed the issue within 6 days.

References

External links

 Le Meur's personal blog in English and in French
 Interview with Loic Le Meur video
 Interview with Loic Le Meur about his new company Seesmic video

1972 births
Living people
Businesspeople in information technology
HEC Paris alumni
French bloggers
Place of birth missing (living people)
French company founders
French people of Breton descent
French people of Catalan descent
French male writers
Male bloggers